Villarejo de Salvanés is a municipality of Spain. Located in Comunidad de Madrid.

References 

Municipalities in the Community of Madrid